Villa is an unincorporated community in Clark County, in the U.S. state of Ohio.

History
Villa was not officially platted. A post office called Villa was established in 1887, and remained in operation until 1903.

References

Unincorporated communities in Clark County, Ohio
1887 establishments in Ohio
Populated places established in 1887
Unincorporated communities in Ohio